The River Wylye is a chalk stream in the south of England, with clear water flowing over gravel. It is popular with anglers for fly fishing. A half-mile stretch of the river and three lakes in Warminster are a local nature reserve.

Course  

The Wylye rises below the White Sheet Downs just south of Maiden Bradley in south-west Wiltshire, then flows north through the Upper Deverills. A tributary which feeds the man-made Shearwater lake joins near Crockerton.  On the southern edge of Warminster the river turns to head generally east south east, running through the Mid Wylye Valley, into which the A36 road and the Wessex Main Line are also squeezed. The river passes through or touches the parishes of Bishopstrow, Norton Bavant, Heytesbury, Knook, Upton Lovell, Boyton, Codford, Stockton, Wylye and Wilton, near the southern edge of Salisbury Plain. At Wilton, it comes to an end, running into the River Nadder, which itself flows into the Hampshire Avon. That eventually drains into the English Channel at Christchurch.

The Wylye forms part of the River Avon drainage basin and is fed by several winterbournes, which commonly dry up completely in the summer, so that the water flow in the river can vary greatly according to the time of year.

Features 
Two SSSIs are associated with the river: Steeple Langford Down and Wylye and Church Dean Downs. The Wylye Valley Vineyard is at Crockerton, near the river's source.

Name
Wilton, and hence Wiltshire (which was originally Wiltonshire), are named after the river. There is also a village of Wylye.

In literature
The River Wylye is one of the five rivers mentioned in Edward Rutherfurd’s novel Sarum.

Water quality
The Environment Agency measures the water quality of the river systems in England. Each is given an overall ecological status, which may be one of five levels: high, good, moderate, poor and bad. There are several components that are used to determine this, including biological status, which looks at the quantity and varieties of invertebrates, angiosperms and fish. Chemical status, which compares the concentrations of various chemicals against known safe concentrations, is rated good or fail.

Water quality of the Wylye in 2019:

Villages 
Villages on or near the Wylye include (source to confluence):

Maiden Bradley
Kingston Deverill
Monkton Deverill
Brixton Deverill
Longbridge Deverill
Crockerton
Norton Bavant
Heytesbury
Sutton Veny
Upton Lovell
Boyton
Sherrington
Codford
Stockton
Bapton
Fisherton Delamere
Wylye
Hanging Langford
Steeple Langford
Great Wishford
Stoford
South Newton
Wilton

References

Sources
 Wiltshire.gov.uk – Chalk River Valleys

Wylye
Local nature reserves in Wiltshire